Giselher Wolfgang Klebe (28 June 19255 October 2009) was a German composer, and an academic teacher. He composed more than 140 works, among them 14 operas, all based on literary works, eight symphonies, 15 solo concerts, chamber music, piano works, and sacred music.

Biography

Giselher Klebe was born in Mannheim, Germany. He received musical tuition early in his life from his mother, the violinist Gertrud Klebe. The family relocated in 1932 to Munich, where his mother's sister, Melanie Michaelis, continued the training. His father's profession required a further relocation in 1936 to Rostock.

Following the separation of his parents, Klebe moved with his mother and sister to Berlin. During 1938, the 13-year-old sketched his first compositions. In 1940, he began studies in violin, viola, and composition, supported by a grant from the city of Berlin.

After serving his Reichsarbeitsdienst (labour service), Klebe was conscripted to military service as signalman. After the German surrender, he was taken prisoner of war by the Russian forces. Due to ill health, he was soon released.

Having convalesced, Klebe continued his music studies in Berlin (1946–1951), first under Joseph Rufer, then in master classes by Boris Blacher. He worked for the radio station Berliner Rundfunk until 1948, when he began to work full-time as a composer.

Klebe was inspired and influenced by works of authors and artists, especially his contemporaries. In 1951 he composed Die Zwitschermaschine Op. 7, (The Twittering Machine), based on the painting by Paul Klee. His first opera, based on Friedrich Schiller's play Die Räuber (The Robbers), was produced in 1957. He composed two operas based on plays by Ödön von Horváth.

In 1957, Klebe succeeded Wolfgang Fortner as docent for the subjects of Composition and Music Theory at the Hochschule für Musik Detmold. He was appointed professor in 1962 and, over the years, taught many students who went on to become well-known composers: Theo Brandmüller, Matthias Pintscher, and Lars Woldt.

Honors and legacy
In 1964 Klebe was appointed member of the West Berlin Akademie der Künste (Arts Academy).
In 1965 he received the Westfälischer Musikpreis (later named the Hans-Werner-Henze-Preis).
In 2002, the city of Detmold, where he lived, made him an honorary citizen.

Marriage and family
On 10 September 1946 Klebe married the violinist Lore Schiller. They had two daughters, Sonja Katharina and Annette Marianne. Lore Klebe wrote the librettos for some of his operas, including Der Jüngste Tag (Doomsday).

Klebe died on 5 October 2009 in Detmold at the age of 84 after a long illness.

Works

References 
Notes

Sources
Erik Levi, "Klebe, Giselher", in The New Grove Dictionary of Opera, ed. Stanley Sadie (London, 1992) 
Michael Herbert Rentzsch (with Erik Levi): "Klebe, Giselher", Grove Music Online, ed. L. Macy, Oxford University Press

External links
 
 Giselher-Klebe-Archiv Archive of the Akademie der Künste, Berlin
"Giselher Klebe (1925–2009)", Klassika

German opera composers
Male opera composers
20th-century classical composers
21st-century classical composers
1925 births
2009 deaths
People from Detmold
Commanders Crosses of the Order of Merit of the Federal Republic of Germany
Academic staff of the Hochschule für Musik Detmold
German male classical composers
20th-century German composers
21st-century German composers
20th-century German male musicians
21st-century German male musicians